Bruno Gabriel Galván (born 8 May 1994) is an Argentine professional footballer who plays as a goalkeeper for Deportivo Morón.

Career

Club
Galván's career began with Boca Juniors, joining as a youth in 2005. He didn't make a first-team appearance for the Argentine Primera División club, but was an unused substitute on five occasions throughout the 2015 season. On 22 July 2017, Galván joined Ecuadorian Serie B side Gualaceo. Nineteen appearances followed for the goalkeeper, with Gualaceo finishing the campaign in seventh place. After departing Ecuador at the end of 2017, Galván returned to Argentine football in July 2018 after securing a move to Primera B Nacional's Deportivo Morón. His professional debut arrived on 5 October during a 1–0 victory over Agropecuario.

International
In 2011, Galván was selected to represent Argentina at both the South American U-17 Championship and FIFA U-17 World Cup. He won a cap at each tournament, namely against Ecuador and England.

Career statistics
.

References

External links

1994 births
Living people
Footballers from Buenos Aires
Argentine footballers
Argentina youth international footballers
Association football goalkeepers
Argentine expatriate footballers
Expatriate footballers in Ecuador
Argentine expatriate sportspeople in Ecuador
Ecuadorian Serie B players
Primera Nacional players
Boca Juniors footballers
Deportivo Morón footballers